Tecklenburg is a town in the district of Steinfurt, in North Rhine-Westphalia, Germany. Its name comes from the ruined castle around which it was built. The town is situated on the Hermannsweg hiking trail.

The coat of arms shows an anchor and three seeblatts.

Geography
It is located in the foothills of the Teutoburg Forest, southwest of Osnabrück.

Division of the town
Tecklenburg consists of 4 districts (with farming communities):

Neighbouring municipalities
 Ibbenbüren
 Westerkappeln
 Lotte
 Hagen
 Lengerich
 Ladbergen
 Saerbeck

History
In the 12th century the county of Tecklenburg emerged in the region that is now called the "Tecklenburger Land" in the western foothills of the Teutoburg Forest. From 1263, when the county of Tecklenburg was merged with the neighbouring county of Bentheim, Tecklenburg was ruled by the counts of Bentheim-Tecklenburg. In 1701, Tecklenburg was conquered by the Kingdom of Prussia and subsequently incorporated.

Sights

Today, the town of Tecklenburg is a tourist destination, because of its largely intact medieval townscape. Main sites include the ruined castle (now serving as open-air theatre during the summer) and the Stadtkirche (the main, old church) including tombs of the counts and princes of Tecklenburg-Bentheim, as well as others prominent in the history of the county and city.

Tecklenburg Castle 
Tecklenburg Castle is a ruined fortification in Tecklenburg, used today as an outdoor theatre.

The castle was built around 1250. Anna von Tecklenburg-Schwerin made a lot of structural changes. Around 1700, the castle was dilapidated and its brick and stone was used for other buildings in Tecklenburg, leaving nothing but a ruin.

International relations

Tecklenburg is twinned with:
  Chalonnes-sur-Loire (France) since 1982

Notable people

 Adolf von Tecklenburg (c. 1185–1224), Bishop of Osnabrück
 Friedrich Adolf Krummacher (1767–1845), theologian
 Friedrich von Bodelschwingh, Senior (1831–1910), theologian
 Hermann Beitzke (1875–1953), physician and tuberculosis researcher
 Erwin Vierow (1890–1982), General of the Infantry

See also
 Bentheim-Tecklenburg

References

External links

  
 Corpus juris of the province Tecklenburg/Lingen online 
 Burgenwelt: Burg Tecklenburg
 
 Pages about the Tecklenburg Open-Air Games
  (pdf; 4.4 MB)

1808 disestablishments
States and territories established in the 11th century
Steinfurt (district)